Kassina senegalensis, also known as the Senegal running frog, along with many other common names, is a species of frog native to much of Africa. It is a small and solidly-built species, with large eyes. Most of the body is greyish-black, but there are brown bands and spots on certain parts. Their breeding occurs in water, where eggs are laid in various locations and fertilised one-by-one. They eat many different prey items, and use skin secretions to avoid becoming prey themselves. Their population is assumed to be very large and not in any immediate danger.

Taxonomy
Kassina senegalis was first described in 1841 by André Marie Constant Duméril and Gabriel Bibron as Cystignathus senegalensis. Their description came from specimens which had been collected from ponds in Senegal, sent to them by an individual identified only as Mr. Heudelot. The genus Cystignathus was split into several new genera in 1853 by Charles Frédéric Girard, with senegalensis ending up as the only species of the newly erected genus Kassina. Six other species names, four alternate combinations, and eight proposed subspecies of this species have been all been subsequently  synonymised with the latest accepted name.

Description
Senegal running frogs are relatively small and stocky. The vomer teeth of the upper mouth are arranged in two small groups. The tongue is heart-shaped. The Eustachian tube is quite small, and the eardrums are indistinct from the layer of skin covering them. There are four fingers, completely free of webbing; in size, the third is longest, followed by the fourth, then the second, then fourth. The toes are also unwebbed. The eyes are large and somewhat protruding, while the head is shaped like an equilateral triangle, rounded at the tip. The entire body is smooth. In colour, Kassina senegalensis is greyish black, with brown longitudinal bands and spots of the same colour on various locations of the body, including the ears and eyes. Males are a little smaller than females, and have chocolate-coloured vocal sacs that can grow nearly twice their normal size during calling.

Identification of tadpoles can be difficult, as there is much variation among them, a trait shared with other species in the genus Kassina.

Distribution and habitat
Kassina senegalensis is found over a large portion of Africa, from Senegal in the west, to Ethiopia and Somalia in the east, all the way south to South Africa. Its presence is uncertain in Burundi, the Democratic Republic of the Congo, Guinea-Bissau, Mauritania, and Togo. In the northern parts of its distribution, specifically Kenya and Tanzania, the relationship between its range and that of its relative Kassina somalica is not well understood. It is founds in many different habitats, including savannas (both humid and dry), shrublands, montane grasslands, wetlands, and artificial environments (such as pastureland and canals).

Behaviour and ecology

Reproduction and life cycle
Breeding can take place in both temporary and permanent sources of water, although due to their relatively long growth time, these are usually permanent or semi-permanent. Males call to attract females. Eggs are fertilised one-at-a-time in this manner. The pair frequently move during this process, laying between one and fifteen eggs at each position. A total of about 600 are laid, which hatch after around six days. The presence of fish in breeding ponds was found to cause shorter breeding periods, although this was different than many other frog species, which simply did not breed at all. All species, K. senegalensis included, immediately stopped breeding activity when the catfish Clarias gariepinus was introduced. They take 50–60 days to complete metamorphosis.

Diet
Data collected from individuals in Cameroon indicates this species to be a generalist forager. In the study, Orthoptera species formed the bulk of prey at 36%, followed by ants (24%) and spiders (10%). There was no clear size preference for prey.

Skin secretion
The skin of Kassina senegalensis contains a secretagogue peptide that releases a powerful histamine. This may create a painful sensation for potential predators, and definitely leads to capillary dilation and extravasation of plasma, which could allow easier access for other secretions into nearby tissue.

Conservation
The International Union for the Conservation of Nature (IUCN) has rated this species as least-concern, citing its extensive range, tolerance of many different habitats, and presumably large population. It is unknown whether its population is increasing, decreasing, or remaining the same. On a local scale, Senegal running frogs may be affected by particularly severe degradation of habitat, but the majority of the species is not threatened. They are also sometimes traded internationally as pets, but not at a high enough level to be of special concern, according to the IUCN. Throughout its range, it is found in many protected areas.

Note

References

Kassina
Taxonomy articles created by Polbot
Amphibians described in 1841